Acts 24 is the twenty-fourth chapter of the Acts of the Apostles in the New Testament of the Christian Bible. It records the period of Paul's imprisonment in Caesarea. The book containing this chapter is anonymous but early Christian tradition uniformly affirmed that Luke composed this book as well as the Gospel of Luke.

Text
The original text was written in Koine Greek. This chapter is divided into 27 verses.

Textual witnesses
Some early manuscripts containing the text of this chapter are:
 Codex Vaticanus (AD 325–350)
 Codex Sinaiticus (330–360)
 Codex Bezae (c. 400)
 Codex Alexandrinus (400–440)
 Codex Ephraemi Rescriptus (c. 450; extant verses 16–27)
 Codex Laudianus (c. 550)

Location

The events in this chapter took place in Caesarea.

The speech for the prosecution (24:1–9)
The Sanhedrin promptly sent a delegation, bringing a professional rhetor (KJV: orator; NRSV attorney) to make a formal rhetorical presentation on their behalf (verse 1). The venue of the hearing has changed to be 'much more in the Roman sphere than the Jewish'.

Verse 1
And after five days Ananias the high priest descended with the elders, and with a certain orator named Tertullus, who informed the governor against Paul.
"Ananias the high priest" (verse 1; cf. 23:2): is Ananias son of Nebedaeus, who was appointed by Herod of Chalcis in 47 CE, and replaced in 59 (Josephus. Antiquities. 20.103, 131, 179, 2O5).

Verse 5
For we have found this man a pestilent fellow, and a mover of sedition among all the Jews throughout the world, and a ringleader of the sect of the Nazarenes:
"The sect of the Nazarenes" refers to the 'followers of Jesus the Nazarene' (cf. Matthew 2:23), that is, Christians. This appellation for Christians is attested in the writing by Tertullian (Adv. Marc. 4.8).

The speech for the defense (24:10–21)
In his turn to speak, Paul, like Tertullus, focuses his self-defence (apologia, verse 10) on events in Jerusalem, that he has not been involved in disputes or riots in synagogue or temple (verse 12), and, 'as Luke takes pains to show, no offence against the law can be proved against him' (verse 13).

Felix defers judgement (24:22–27)

When prosecution and defense have presented their cases, Felix the procurator 'refuses to be drawn into making a judgement', first 'on the pretext of waiting for the tribune's report' (verse 22), but then 'no more is heard of this'. According to custom at that time, Paul could be released at the end of Felix's term of office (verse 27), yet 'Felix deliberately leaves the case for his successor'.

Verse 27
 But after two years Porcius Festus succeeded Felix; and Felix, wanting to do the Jews a favor, left Paul bound.
"Porcius Festus": the procurator of Judea succeeding Antonius Felix. His exact time in office is not known, with the earliest proposed date for the start of his term c. AD 55–6, while the latest is AD 61, but most scholars opt for a date between 58 and 60, based on a change in the provincial coinage of Judaea attested for Nero's fifth year points to AD 59.

See also

 Related Bible parts: Acts 21, Acts 22, Acts 23

References

Sources

External links
 King James Bible - Wikisource
English Translation with Parallel Latin Vulgate
Online Bible at GospelHall.org (ESV, KJV, Darby, American Standard Version, Bible in Basic English)
Multiple bible versions at Bible Gateway (NKJV, NIV, NRSV etc.)

24